Patriata also known as New Murree is a hill station in northern Punjab, Pakistan. Patriata is located in Murree Tehsil which is a subdivision of Murree District.

Tourism 
The cooler climate in Patriata makes this hill station a favorable tourist location compared to further south. The large tourist presence in Murree also makes Patriata a more attractive hub for many. A Gondola chair lift and cable car system allow visitors to access the highest points. The area is heavily forested and there are many monkeys and leopards in the area.

References

External links 

 
 latest pictures of Patriata
 Travel Tips on Patriata 

Hill stations in Pakistan
Tourist attractions in Murree